Manuel 'Manolo' Higuera Sancho (born 14 March 1964) is a Spanish retired footballer who played as a forward, and was the president of Racing de Santander.

Club career
Born in Santander, Cantabria, Higuera graduated with Racing de Santander's youth setup. He made his first team – and La Liga – debut on 9 September 1984, starting in a 0–1 away loss against Real Valladolid.

Higuera left the Verdiblancos in 1988, after appearing rarely.

Post-retirement
After retiring Higuera worked as an advocate, being also a businessman. On 14 June 2015 he succeeded Juan Antonio Sañudo as club chairman, as Racing was relegated back to Segunda División B after only one year.

References

External links
 

1964 births
Living people
Spanish footballers
Footballers from Santander, Spain
Association football forwards
La Liga players
Segunda División players
Rayo Cantabria players
Racing de Santander players
Spanish football chairmen and investors